Clan MacGillivray is a Highland Scottish clan and is a member of the Clan Chattan Confederation. The clan does not currently have a clan chief, but following a petition to the Lord Lyon a family convention was held at Culloden on 15 April 2016. Submissions from four applicants for the role of commander were heard and Iain Donald MacGillivray was nominated and subsequently received his commission from the Lord Lyon. The role subsists for an initial period of five years but can be renewed for a further five years, and thereafter the commander can petition to be chief.

History

Origins of the clan

The clan MacGillivray was an important clan even before the Norsemen were driven out of the Outer Hebrides by King Somerled, who was Lord of the Isles in the 12th century. In 1222, Alexander II of Scotland subdued Argyll, and the clan Mhic Gillebrath became dispersed. Some of the clan remained on the Isle of Mull, while others stayed in Morvern. There is a tradition that asserts that the chief of the clan placed himself under the protection of the chiefs of clan Mackintosh, who were also chiefs of the Chattan Confederation. Thereafter the clan MacGillivray belonged to the clan Chattan.

16th to 17th centuries

The MacGillivray clan was first accurately recorded in Dunmaglass in 1549. In 1609, there was a great gathering of the Chattan Confederation, at which loyalties were given to the Mackintosh chief, and the haill kin and race of MacGillivray was represented by Malcolm MacGillivray of Dalcrombie and Duncan MacGillivray of Dunmaglass. The MacGillivrays were persecuted by their Calvinist and Presbyterian neighbors owing to their support of Episcopal polity of the church.

18th century & Jacobite risings

Along with most of the other clans of the Chattan Confederation, the MacGillivrays were staunch Jacobites in both the Jacobite rising of 1715 and the Jacobite rising of 1745. During the 1745 rising, the chief of Mackintoshes and clan Chattan was however a serving officer in the Black Watch regiment of the British Army, but his wife, Lady Anne Mackintosh (née Farquharson), rallied the Chattan Confederation in support of the Jacobites and placed chief Alexander MacGillivray in command of the clan Chattan regiment. Alexander MacGillivray was killed leading his clan at the Battle of Culloden in 1746 along with many of his followers. A graveyard at Dunlichity commemorates the many MacGillivrays who fell in the battle. After Culloden, many MacGillivrays emigrated across the Atlantic, where many of them were successful, particularly as traders.

Clan chief

The last chief to live at Dunmaglass was the 13th laird, Capt. John William MacGillivray, who had to sell his estate and died without an heir in 1914. The chiefship then passed to a cousin of his, John Farquhar MacGillivray, who lived in Toronto, Ontario, Canada. John Farquhar MacGillivray was chief for 32 years when he died in 1942 without an heir, and the last chief of clan MacGillivray. A Dr Angus MacGillivary [d.1947] tried to claim the chieftainship but was unable to prove his lineage—although he was awarded a variation of the MacGillivray coat of arms in 1914. Another Canadian, Col. George B. MacGillivray, later petitioned Lord Lyon King of Arms three times between 1953 and 1989 to be recognised as chief. Lord Lyon, not satisfied with the proofs MacGillivray submitted, denied him status of chief, but commissioned him as commander of the clan. MacGillivray served as Commander for five years before dying in 1994, and to this day the clan remains without a Chief, but does once again have a Commander to lead it.
In 2016, the Clan MacGillivray International Association organised a derbh fine or Family Convention with members of that Association and the  clan MacGillivary Societies of  America, Australia Canada and the Netherlands nominated Iain MacGillivray for the role of Clan Commander.   The Lord Lyon accepted the nomination and presented him with his Commission, appointing and confirming him in this important leadership role for Clan MacGillivray.

Clan castles

Dunmaglas, which is about six miles east of Inverfarigaig in Inverness-shire, was held by the MacGillivrays from at least the sixteenth century, if not earlier. Dalcrombie, which is nearby, was also held by the clan.

Associated names

Clan MacGillivray does not have any septs, though common variations of the names MacGillivray and McGillivray, associated with the clan, are listed as follows. Note that the prefix Mac/Mc are interchangeable, as well as the capitalisation of the second syllable.

MacGillavery. 	
MacGillavry.	
MacGillivary.	
MacGillivoor.	
MacGillivrey.	
MacGillivry.
	
MacGillvary.	
MacGillveary.	
MacGillviray.	
MacGillivary.	
MacGillvrey.	
MacGilvary.	

MacGilveray.	
MacGilvery.	
MacGilvra.	
MacGilvray.	
MacGilvreay.	
MacGilvry.
	
MacIlbra.
MacIllevorie.
MacIlvora.
MacIlvoray.
McGilvra.
MacIlvrae.
MacIlvray.

McGilvray.
McGilvrey.
McGilvery.
McGillivary.
McGillivray.
McGilberry.
	
Gilvary.

Trivia 
A playable character inspired by scottish culture in the video game For Honor from the french publisher Ubisoft can be heard shouting "Dunmaghlas!", the historic War cry of the Clan. One of the character and story writers for the game was Ariadne MacGillivray, a member of the Clan.

See also
Armigerous clan
Chattan Confederation
Scottish clan
Lachlan McGillivray {1718-1799}-the father of  Alexander McGillivray
William McGillivray (1764-1825)

Notes

External links

electricscotland.com
Clan MacGillivray ScotClans
Clan Mac Gillavry Netherlands

Scottish clans
Armigerous clans